Rachel Makata (nee Dolheguy; born 10 July 1974) is a former female rugby union player. She played for  internationally and for Auckland. She was in the squad that won the 2006 Rugby World Cup in Canada. Makata also represented Auckland's under 21 netball team.

Makata made only two appearances for the Black Ferns, she scored a try in her international debut at the 2006 Rugby World Cup on 4 September against Samoa. Her last appearance was against Scotland in the pool stages.

References

External links
Black Ferns Profile

1974 births
Living people
New Zealand women's international rugby union players
New Zealand female rugby union players
Female rugby union players